Luo Guiping (born 20 April 1993) is a Chinese footballer who plays as a midfielder for Meizhou Hakka and the China women's national football team.

International career
In 2013, Luo was included in China's squad for the 2013 Valais Women's Cup in Switzerland. She appeared as a substitute in both matches, with the team finishing as runners-up to New Zealand.

In May 2019, she was included in the squad for the 2019 FIFA Women's World Cup in France.

References

External links 

1993 births
Living people
Chinese women's footballers
China women's international footballers
Women's association football midfielders
2019 FIFA Women's World Cup players
Footballers at the 2020 Summer Olympics
Olympic footballers of China